Greensboro Township is one of thirteen townships in Henry County, Indiana, United States. As of the 2010 census, its population was 1,728 and it contained 715 housing units.

Greensboro Township was organized in 1831. It was named after the city of Greensboro, North Carolina.

Geography
The streams of Bench Run, Dry Fork, Egg Run, Feather Fork, Goose Run, Goslin Creek, Hatch Brook, Mont Branch, Mount Lawn Brook, Quack Run, Quill Run, Ten Creek, Web Run and York Run run through this township.

Cities and towns
 Greensboro
 Kennard
 Shirley (east quarter)

Unincorporated towns
 Mount Lawn
 Woodville
(This list is based on USGS data and may include former settlements.)

Adjacent townships
 Harrison Township (north)
 Henry Township (east)
 Spiceland Township (southeast)
 Wayne Township (southwest)
 Brown Township, Hancock County (west)

Cemeteries
The township contains four cemeteries: Greensboro Friends, Hicksite, Greensboro Township and Mason.

The Greensboro Friends Cemetery was established on 18 March 1825 and is located next to Greensboro Pike. Following the "great separation" of 1827-28 of the Quakers, Hicksite Cemetery was founded on 26 Oct 1830 as a ministry of the Greensboro Friends who were in the Hicksite Quaker faction.

The small Greensboro Township Cemetery is located immediately southwest of the smaller Mason Cemetery.

Major highways
  Indiana State Road 234

References
 
 United States Census Bureau cartographic boundary files

External links

Townships in Henry County, Indiana
Townships in Indiana